Phobaeticus serratipes (formerly known as Pharnacia serratipes) is a species of stick insect  that at one time was the longest known insect, with one female specimen recorded as being 555 mm long. This measurement includes the legs fully extended front and rear, and the actual length of the body alone is considerably shorter. This insect is endemic to Peninsular Malaysia,  Singapore and Sumatra. It is a popular species among those who raise stick insects.

The record for longest known insect is now held by an unnamed species of Phryganistria measuring 624 mm, held in the Insect Museum of West China in Chengdu. Phobaeticus serratipes is also slightly shorter in body length than one specimen of Phobaeticus kirbyi.

See also 

 List of largest insects

References

External links
 
 Phasmid Study Group: Phobaeticus serratipes
 Phasmida Species File: Phobaeticus serratipes
 

Phasmatodea
Insects described in 1835
Taxa named by John Edward Gray
Phasmatodea of Malesia